Escunhau is a village located in the municipality of Vielha e Mijaran, in Province of Lleida province, Catalonia, Spain. As of 2020, it has a population of 104.

Geography 
Escunhau is located 164km north of Lleida.

References

Populated places in the Province of Lleida